Murosternum latefasciatum is a species of beetle in the family Cerambycidae. It was described by Stephan von Breuning in 1938. It is known from Nigeria and the Ivory Coast.

References

Tragocephalini
Beetles described in 1938